Fernando Luis Capurro (born 23 April 1963) is a Chilean handball coach for the Chilean national team.

References

1963 births
Living people
Handball coaches of international teams
Chilean sports coaches
Place of birth missing (living people)